Cedar Hall is an unincorporated community in Worcester County, Maryland, United States.  Cedar Hall is located in the southwestern corner of the county along the Pocomoke River.

References

Unincorporated communities in Worcester County, Maryland
Unincorporated communities in Maryland